David Parker was a member of the Pennsylvania House of Representatives, representing the 115th House district in Monroe County, Pennsylvania.

References

External links
Official Web Site
PA House profile

Living people
People from Monroe County, Pennsylvania
Republican Party members of the Pennsylvania House of Representatives
21st-century American politicians
Year of birth missing (living people)